Sultan Murad may refer to:

Rulers 
 Sultan Murad (Aq Qoyunlu)
 Murad I
 Murad II
 Murad III
 Murad IV
 Murad V

Armed groups 
 Sultan Murad Division